Lyropupa anceyana is a species of air-breathing land snails, terrestrial pulmonate gastropod mollusks in the family Pupillidae. This species is endemic to the United States.

References

Endemic fauna of the United States
Molluscs of the United States
Lyropupa
Gastropods described in 1920
Taxonomy articles created by Polbot